United Nations Security Council resolution 689, adopted unanimously on 9 April 1991, after recalling Resolution 687 (1991), the council noted a report by the Secretary-General and decided to establish the United Nations Iraq–Kuwait Observation Mission to monitor the demilitarized zone between Iraq and Kuwait, known as the Kuwait–Iraq barrier.

Acting under Chapter VII of the United Nations Charter, the council established the Mission for an initial period of six months, deciding to review the question of its termination every six months. Its presence was to deter border violations and monitor hostile or potentially hostile action mounted by either country against the other.

See also
 1991 uprisings in Iraq
 Gulf War
 Invasion of Kuwait
 Iraq–Kuwait relations
 Iraqi no-fly zones
 List of United Nations Security Council Resolutions 601 to 700 (1987–1991)

References

External links
 
Text of the Resolution at undocs.org

 0689
 0689
History of Kuwait
1991 in Iraq
1991 in Kuwait
 0689
April 1991 events